Perth Zoo is a  zoological park in South Perth, Western Australia.  The zoo first opened in 1898 and by 2011 housed 1258 animals of 164 species and an extensive botanical collection.
It is a full institutional member of the Zoo and Aquarium Association (ZAA) and the World Association of Zoos and Aquariums (WAZA).

History
The Perth Zoological Gardens were opened on 17 October 1898 by the Governor of Western Australia, Lieutenant-Colonel Sir Gerard Smith. Planning for the zoo had started in 1896 when the Acclimatisation Society first met, the original purpose of which was to introduce European animals to Australia and establish a zoo for conservation purposes. In 1897 this group invited the director of the Melbourne Zoo, Albert Le Souef, to choose a site. His son Ernest was chosen as the first director of the Perth Zoo, and work began in 1897.

The first exhibits built included two bear caves, a monkey house, a mammal house and a model castle for guinea pigs. The first animals on display included an orangutan, two monkeys, four ostriches, a pair of lions, and a tiger. At first there were only six staff members. The zoo had 53,000 visitors in its first nine months, and had not been closed for a single day since it was opened, until it was temporarily closed from 24 March 2020 during the coronavirus outbreak.

From the start Ernest Le Souef worked to create a botanical collection as well as an animal collection to preserve for the future. Work on the gardens started as soon as the site was chosen and finalised. Since the site was mostly sand and lacked nutrients and water, loads of manure needed to be brought in, and a well was bored in 1898 to allow irrigation. The zoo included rose gardens, lupin fields, tropical plants, and palms. The original palm collection still stands and boasts over 61 species including Canary Island date palms that are now over 110 years old. The zoo also grew crops for animals including lettuce, alfalfa, carrots, lucerne and onions. This tradition is still alive, with the zoo producing fodder including hibiscus, bamboo, Fijian fire plant and mirror plant.

In 2010/11, the zoo had a paid staff of about 248 (167 full-time equivalents), plus about 300 volunteer docents.

Until her death in July 2022 aged 65, Tricia a female Asian elephant was one of the most famous animal residents at Perth Zoo, having lived at the zoo for 59 years since 1963. After living nearly twenty years on her own, she was joined by three rescued orphan three year old Asian elephants from Malaysia in December 1992 (of which female Permai, and male Putra Mas still reside at the zoo). Tricia was euthanised by zoo veterinarians due to ongoing age-related health issues. After a cremation her ashes were placed under a forty year old 15 metre tall jacaranda tree on the zoo's Main Lawn, a memory plaque to be unveiled in her memory. Additionally a conservation guard hut in Sumatra was named in her honour. Following in the direction of many contemporary city zoos, Perth Zoo plans to find homes for Asian elephants Permai and Putra Mas at open-range zoos either nationally or overseas, and will no longer house elephants in the near future.

Governance

The head managers of Perth Zoo have from its opening to the present been:
E.A. Le Souef – as director 1897 – 1935
L.E. Shapcott – as president of the Zoological Gardens Board 1932-1941
W.K. Lyall – as superintendent of the zoo 1950-1967
Tom Spence – as zoo director 1967-1984
John De Jose – as zoo director 1984-1994
Ricky Burges – as zoo CEO 1995-1998
Brian Easton – as zoo CEO 1999-2003
Susan Hunt – as zoo CEO 2004–2017
Maria Finnigan – as zoo acting CEO 2017-2018
Wendy Attenborough – as zoo CEO 2018–present
 Zoological Parks Authority, which had been known as
 Western Australian Acclimatization Committee (1896 – 1967?)
 Zoological Gardens Board 1967 – 2002

Exhibits

Perth Zoo largest three precincts are (alphabetically) the African Savannah, the Asian Rainforest and the Australian Bushwalk, with many others including the Australian Wetlands, Nocturnal House, Penguin Plunge, Primate Trail, Reptile Encounter and the zoo's Main Lake. All the exhibits are designed to mimic the animals' natural habitats and utilise passive barriers where possible, to improve the wellbeing of the animals.

African Savannah

The African Savannah (opened in 1991) replaced a variety of barred cages, and was the largest construction project undertaken at the zoo when it was created. The exhibit recreates the African savannah. Visitors view the animals from a path that simulates a dry riverbed running through the savannah. The resident animals are:

 African lion
 African painted dog
 Cape porcupine
 Meerkat

 Plains zebra
 Radiated tortoise
 Rothschild's giraffe
 Southern white rhinoceros
 Spotted hyena

(additionally although actually natives to the continent and islands off South American respectively, exhibits close to the boundaries of the 'African Savannah' area can be found for Bolivian squirrel monkey and a pair of Galapagos tortoise).

                   

                  

Asian Rainforest

The Asian Rainforest is home to a number of threatened Asian species.  These include:

 Asian elephant
 Asian small-clawed otter
 Binturong
 Komodo dragon
 Nepalese red panda

 Northern white-cheeked gibbon
 Sumatran orangutan
 Sumatran tiger
 Sun bear

(Red-eared slider although in-fact a turtle species native to North America, not Asia, are housed in a glass-fronted underwater viewing exhibit in this area of the zoo too.)

Perth Zoo contributes to the conservation of many of these species in the wild. 

                     

Australian Bushwalk

The Australia Bushwalk takes visitors on a journey through the Australian landscape where they can see:

 Bush stone-curlew
 Dingo
 Emu
 Koala
 Red kangaroo
 Short-beaked echidna
 Southern hairy-nosed wombat
 Tammar wallaby
 Tasmanian devil
 Western brush wallaby
 Western grey kangaroo

A specially designed exhibit in this area visitors can access on a slight detour is the 'Numbats Under Threat' exhibit, which showcases the endangered Western Australian marsupial and several other species in both the large main enclosure and the walkthrough exhibit fronting the entrance. The species in this area are:
 Numbat
 Quokka
 Rufous whistler
 Splendid fairy-wren

                    

Another detour takes visitors to the 'Western Australian Black Cockatoo' exhibit aviaries, planted with cockatoo food trees and home to:
 Baudin's cockatoo
 Carnaby's black cockatoo
 Forest red-tailed black cockatoo

A walk-in aviary is located close in the 'Australian Bushwalk' area of the zoo and is home to:
 Black-winged stilt
 Brush bronzewing
 Elegant parrot
 Purple-crowned lorikeet

 in the Australian Wetlands habitat at the zoo]]
Australian Wetlands

This exhibit begins with an entrance building which exhibits:
 Australian green tree frog
 Magnificent tree frog
 Motorbike frog
 Western swamp turtle

The Australian Wetlands main area is a 2,750 sqm wetlands habitat which houses:

 Australasian shoveler
 Black swan
 Black-necked stork
 Black-winged stilt
 Blue-billed duck
 Brolga
 Bush stone-curlew
 Eastern great egret
 Freckled duck
 Glossy ibis
 Green pygmy goose
 Little pied cormorant
 Pied heron
 Plumed whistling duck
 Radjah shelduck
 Royal spoonbill

The main exhibit walkway leads to an area which exhibits for:
 Estuarine crocodile
 Freshwater crocodile
 Merten's water monitor

Nocturnal House

The Nocturnal House was opened in 1977 and is designed in a circular viewing layout that lets visitors circumnavigate the interior of the building while viewing nocturnal animals (mainly Australian-native species) under simulated moonlight. Species kept in this building include:

 Bilby
 Bird-eating tarantula
 Cane toad
 Chuditch
 Dibbler
 Feathertail glider
 Ghost bat
 Long-nosed potoroo
 Northern quoll
 Owlet-nightjar
 Rakali
 Red-tailed phascogale
 Rough-scaled python
 Spiny leaf insect
 Sugar glider
 Sunda slow loris
 Tawny frogmouth
 Western brushtail possum
 Western ringtail possum
 Woylie

Penguin Plunge

Penguin Plunge includes a  pool of filtered salt water with underwater viewing, a beach, a reef, and a rookery. The exhibit is home to:
 Australian little penguin
 Bridled tern

Primate Trail

The 'Primate Trail' exhibit (opened in 1985) is home to lemurs and monkeys including:
 Black-and-white ruffed lemur
 Common marmoset
 Cotton-top tamarin
 Emperor tamarin
 Pygmy marmoset
 Ring-tailed lemur
 Tufted capuchin

Reptile Encounter

The 'Reptile Encounter' reptile-house was opened on World Environment Day in 1997. It contains 17 exhibits designed to match the animal's natural habitat. The building is climate controlled, and displays reptile species from around the world including:

 Black-headed python
 Centralian blue-tongued skink
 Common death adder
 Corn snake
 Dugite
 Frill-necked lizard
 Inland bearded dragon
 Olive python
 Pebble-mimic dragon
 Perentie
 Pygmy python
 Rough-scaled python
 Southwestern carpet python
 Western blue-tongued skink
 Woma python

The Main Lake

Near the entrance to the zoo is the zoo's 'Main Lake' (completed in 1972). Many different species of native water birds freely flock to the lake including:

 Australasian darter
 Australasian shoveler
 Australian pelican
 Australian shelduck
 Australian white ibis
 Black swan
 Black-faced cormorant
 Cattle egret
 Dusky moorhen
 Eurasian coot
 Gray teal
 Great cormorant
 Little black cormorant
 Little pied cormorant
 Nankeen night-heron
 Pacific black duck
 Silver gull
 White-eyed duck
  

The lake has two islands in the centre which are the homes of:
 Black-and-white ruffed lemur
 Javan gibbon

A nearby tropical forest with a board-walk through the centre is home to:
 Goodfellow's tree-kangaroo
 Southern cassowary

The Rainforest Retreat

The zoo's 'Rainforest Retreat' is 4,350 square metre area of the zoo which showcases botanical flora of the tropical zones of the world through a winding rainforest path. Additionally several species of threatened frogs have been bred and raised in this area of the zoo for wild release including 
sunset frog, orange-bellied frog and white-bellied frog.

Scenic Heritage Trail

(a map of which can be downloaded from the website or collected from the Information Centre) is a self-guided walk that takes visitors around the zoo and shows off its historical buildings. Buildings included in this walk are the bird feed shed, kite cage, bear caves, hay shed, mineral baths from 1898, replicas of tennis shelters from 1903, the Scout Hall built in 1931, the 1947 carousel that is still in use, and the Gate Zoo Residence that was built in the 1960s.

The zoo provides a free online service called Talking Zoo which lets visitors download hours of animal information onto their iPod, MP3 player, mobile phone or PDA.

Conservation

The zoo participates in a number of breeding programs for endangered species, both native  Australian and non-native species.  Some Australian species are bred for release into managed habitat in Western Australia, whereas the international species are for increasing genetic diversification in zoo population.

Exotic species

Perth Zoo contributes to the conservation of threatened species in the wild through its fundraising program, 'Wildlife Conservation Action'. Started in 2007, funds raised have been used for the conservation of African painted dogs, Asian elephants, Goodfellow's tree-kangaroos, Javan gibbons, northern white-cheeked gibbons, Rothschild's giraffes, southern white rhinoceroses, Sumatran orangutans, Sumatran tigers,  and sun bears. More than $881,000 has been raised since the program began.

Many individuals of these species have been born at the zoo and later contributed to further generations of international and regional captive-breeding programs.

The zoo's Sumatran orangutan breeding program is one of the most successful in the world, having bred twenty-three Sumatran orangutans between 1970 and 2012 (and additionally eight hybrid Bornean-Sumatran orangutans in the 1970s before difference species status was known, the hybrid orangutans were later sent to zoos in India). In 2006, 2011 and 2016 zoo-born Sumatran orangutans were released into the wild in Bukit Tigapuluh National Park in Sumatra as part of an international program to re-establish a wild population of the critically endangered ape.

Since 2006, Perth Zoo has made a significant contribution to conservation projects in the Bukit Tigapuluh National Park and the surrounding forested areas which support a rich diversity of life including a new colony of orangutans. These orangutans are part of an international program to reintroduce rescued ex-pet and orphaned Sumatran orangutans into the wild to establish a new population of this critically endangered species. More than 139 orangutans have been released into the area and some have bred.

In November 2006, Perth Zoo released 14-year-old, Perth Zoo-born Sumatran orangutan Temara into Bukit Tigapuluh as part of the reintroduction program. Temara was the first zoo-born orangutan in the world to be released into the wild. This was followed in 2011 with the release of the first male zoo-born orangutan, Semeru, into the wild, and in 2016 by another male Nyaru in the wild of Sumatra. Perth Zoo works with the Frankfurt Zoological Society, Indonesian Government and the Australian Orangutan Project on this program and other conservation activities in Bukit Tigapuluh.

Puteri (born 1970) the first of the Sumatran orangutan to be born at the zoo, she has lived at Perth Zoo for more than 50 years (her entire life) and in-turn has birthed six second generation Sumatran orangutans (including Temara, mentioned above). 

Native species

The zoo's 'Wildlife Conservation Action' fundraising program has also contributed towards native Australian species under threat in the wild.

Working with the Department of Environment and Conservation, Perth Zoo breeds threatened Western Australian animal species for release into managed areas of habitat in the wild as part of its Native Species Breeding Program. As of 2011, Perth Zoo breeds species including dibblers, numbats, western swamp turtles, woylies and threatened Western Australian frog species.

The numbat (Myrmecobius fasciatus) Western Australia's mammal emblem and one of only two diurnal marsupials, the numbat is the only Australian mammal to feed exclusively on termites. Despite the establishment of several populations by the Department of Environment and Conservation, it is still classified as endangered by the IUCN. Perth Zoo has been breeding numbats for release into the wild since 1986. The first successful birth was in 1993. By early 2011, 165 numbats had been provided by the zoo for release into protected habitat. In 2022 Perth Zoo bred 13 numbat joeys, and released 10 of them (and a wild rescued female) into Mallee Cliffs National Park in New South Wales.

The western swamp turtle (Pseudemydura umbrina) is a short-necked freshwater turtle and Australia's most critically endangered reptile. The western swamp tortoise has only been recorded at scattered localities in a narrow, three-to-five kilometre strip of the Swan Coastal Plain. Since 1988, Perth Zoo has bred more than 500 western swamp tortoises. The main barrier to the further recovery of the species is the lack of suitable habitat.
Despite this barrier, in 2022 Perth Zoo released 191 western swamp turtles into Scott National Park and bush around Moore River area.

The dibbler (Paranthechinus apicalis) is a small carnivorous marsupial found on two islands off the coast of Jurien Bay (island dibblers) and on the south coast of Western Australia within the Fitzgerald River National Park (mainland dibblers). It once had a much wider distribution, but is now classified as endangered by the IUCN. Perth-Zoo-bred dibblers were used to establish a new population on Escape Island in Jurien Bay. The focus has now changed to breeding dibblers from Fitzgerald River National Park for release on the mainland. By early 2011, over 500 dibblers had been provided by the zoo for release into protected habitat. Additionally between 2019 and 2022 118 dibblers bred at Perth Zoo have been released into Dirk Hartog Island National Park.

The frog breeding program is seeking to increase populations of threatened species, including those listed as vulnerable Spicospina flammocaerulea (sunset frog) and Geocrinia vitellina (orange-bellied frog), and the critically endangered Anstisia alba (white-bellied frog), the latter species being one example of the zoo's success with its captive breeding programs, having bred and released 1,250 white-bellied frogs back into the wild.

Previous breeding programs include:

The chuditch (Dasyurus geoffroi) or western quoll, is one of four quoll species in Australia and is the largest marsupial predator in Western Australia. At the time of European settlement, chuditch occurred in approximately 70% of the continent. By the late 1980s, they had become endangered, with less than 6,000 remaining in the south-west of Western Australia. Perth Zoo has bred more than 300 chuditch for release in the last decade. Since the breeding program began, the status of chuditch has been modified from endangered to vulnerable. This breeding program is now complete.

Shark Bay mouse (Pseudomys fieldi) also known as djoongari, prior to 1993 the only known population of djoongari was on Bernier Island in the north-west of Western Australia, adjacent to the Shark Bay region and was considered to be one of Australia's most geographically restricted animals. Over 300 Perth-Zoo-bred djoongari have been released to sites on the mainland and on islands in the north-west of Western Australia. This breeding program is now complete.

The central rock-rat (Zyzomys pedunculatus) is a critically endangered rodent that was presumed extinct until it was rediscovered in the MacDonnell Ranges Northern Territory in 1996. The last of the zoo's central rock rats were sent to Alice Springs Desert Park in 2007 and the breeding program closed.

Notes

References

 (1930s) The Handbook of the Zoological and Botanical Gardens, South Perth, Western Australia. Perth, W. A. F. W. Simpson, Government. Printer.
 Jenkins, C.F.H. (1962) Illustrated guide, zoological gardens, Labouchere Road, South Perth, Western Australia  Perth: Zoological Gardens Board.

External links

Nature conservation in Western Australia
Tourist attractions in Perth, Western Australia
Zoos in Western Australia
1898 establishments in Australia
Science and technology in Western Australia
South Perth, Western Australia
Parks in Perth, Western Australia